Killing for Culture: An Illustrated History of Death Film from Mondo to Snuff (1994) is the first book in the Creation Cinema series and deals with death in film and media.

Summary
Killing for Culture is a look into death on film including mondo films and snuff films. It is divided into three sections, each with its own focus.

Feature film
This section deals with snuff films as seen in fictional movies. It starts with a chapter on the infamous 1976 film Snuff. Made by husband-and-wife team Michael Findlay and Roberta Findlay in 1971, it was left unreleased until 1976 when  Allan Shackleton added a new ending, a scene depicting what was supposed to be the film crew for the preceding movie murdering one of the actresses. Shackleton marketed the film as authentic snuff and the film was a huge hit.

The second chapter starts with an examination of Michael Powell's 1960 Peeping Tom. The film follows the exploits of a photographer, who in his spare time kills women while filming them. Considered obscene and depraved, even with its lack of nudity or blood, the film ruined Powell's otherwise good career.

The next film looked at in this chapter is Joe D'Amato's 1976 film Emanuelle in America,  part of the Black Emanuelle series. Emanuelle, played by Laura Gemser, is a photographer and journalist who investigates a snuff film and gets a little too close to the truth.

Mondo film

This section of the book covered mondo films, a series of exploitation "shockumentaries" that presented "actual" footage of deviant sexual activities or death.  Many scenes in these films, while represented as real, were fake.

Death film

This section of the book discusses actual deaths caught on film, as presented through the media.  One of the main subjects of the section was the broadcast suicide of Pennsylvania State Senator R. Budd Dwyer.

Notes

References
Creation Books/Killing For Culture (English) Creation Books Retrieved on 2008-2-28
Gelder, Ken Killing for Culture review (English) FindArticles.com Retrieved on 2008-2-28
Bracken, Mike Killing for Culture review (English) Culture Cartel Retrieved on 2008-2-28

Books about death
1994 non-fiction books
History of film